Brian Bradley may refer to:

Brian Bradley (ice hockey, born 1944), Canadian ice hockey winger
Brian Bradley (ice hockey, born 1965), Canadian ice hockey centre
Brian Bradley, president of the News-Press & Gazette Company
Astro (rapper) (Brian Vaughn Bradley Jr., born 1996), American rapper, producer and actor